Jacob Louis Mey (30 October 1926 – 10 February 2023) was a Dutch-born Danish professor of linguistics, specializing in pragmatics. He was professor emeritus in the Institute of Language and Communication at the University of Southern Denmark, after retiring in 1996.

Career
Mey received his PhD in Linguistics from the University of Copenhagen in 1960, supervised by Louis Hjelmslev. He has also worked at the University of Oslo, the University of Texas at Austin, Georgetown University, Yale University, Tsukuba University, The National Language Research Institute, Tokyo, Northwestern University, the City University of Hong Kong, the University of Frankfurt, Universidade Estadual de Campinas, Universidade de Brasília, the University of Haifa and Haifa Technion, Södertörn University College, and Örebro University.

Until 2010, he was chief editor of the Journal of Pragmatics, which he founded in 1977 with Hartmut Haberland. He was chief editor of RASK, the international journal of language and communication, and one of the editors of Pragmatics & Society.

Mey originated the notion of the pragmeme.

In 1992 he was awarded an honorary doctorate by the University of Zaragoza.

Personal life and death
Mey was married to Inger Mey from 1965; they had five children.

May died in Austin, Texas on 10 February 2023, at the age of 96.

Selected works
 Mey, Jacob L. Pragmalinguistics: Theory and Practice (1979) Rasmus Rask Studies in Pragmatic Linguistics 1. 
 Mey, Jacob L. Whose Language? A Study in Linguistic Pragmatics (1985) Pragmatics & Beyond Companion Series 3. 
 Mey, Jacob L. Pragmatics: An Introduction (1993) . 2nd ed. (2001)  
 Gorayska, Barbara, and Jacob L. Mey. Cognitive technology. Springer London, 1996.
 Mey, Jacob L. (ed.) Concise Encyclopedia of Pragmatics (1998) 
 Mey, Jacob L. When Voices Clash: A Study in Literary Pragmatics (2000) Trends in Linguistics 115. 
 Mey, Jacob L. and István Kecskés (eds.). Intention, Common Ground and the Egocentric Speaker-Hearer (2008) Mouton Series in Pragmatics 4.

References

Sources
 Contributor biography, The handbook of Discourse Analysis, ed. Deborah Schiffrin, Deborah Tannen, and Heidi Ehernberger Hamilton, (2001, repr. 2004), pp. xv-xvi
 Jørgen Dines Johansen and Harly Sonne, "Foreword," Pragmatics and Linguistics: Festschrift for Jacob L. Mey on his 60th Birthday 30 October 1986, ed. Jørgen Dines Johansen, Harly Sonne, and Hartmut Haberland (1986) 

1926 births
2023 deaths
Linguists from Denmark
Pragmaticists
Academic staff of Örebro University
Academic staff of the University of Southern Denmark
Danish people of Dutch descent
People from Amsterdam